Central Warehouse is a small warehouse in Salt Lake City, Utah, United States, that is listed on the National Register of Historic Places (NRHP).

Description
The warehouse was built in 1929 for George E. Chandler. The architectural design, construction technique, and its historic integrity make this structure one of the best examples of a warehouse in the city. It was listed on the NRHP August 17, 1982. The Old GreekTown station station served by Utah Transit Authority's TRAX light rail trains in the middle of the street (200 south) in front of it.

See also

 National Register of Historic Places listings in Salt Lake City

References

External links

Buildings and structures in Salt Lake City
Commercial buildings on the National Register of Historic Places in Utah
National Register of Historic Places in Salt Lake City